Tales of a Fourth Grade Nothing is a children's novel written by American author Judy Blume and published in 1972. It is the first in the Fudge series and was followed by Otherwise Known as Sheila the Great, Superfudge, Fudge-a-Mania, and Double Fudge (2002). Although Otherwise Known as Sheila the Great features many of the same characters as the series, it does not fit exactly in the continuity of it because, as a spin-off, it only focuses on Peter's classmate (who later becomes his cousin-in-law), Sheila Tubman.

Originally, the book featured illustrations by Roy Doty, but all post-2002 reprints of it have omitted the pictures.

The story focuses on a nine-year-old boy named Peter Warren Hatcher and his relationship with his two-and-a-half-year-old brother, Farley Drexel "Fudge" Hatcher. He hates the sound of his legal name and prefers Fudge for any and all occasions.

Plot
Peter is frustrated with the horrendous behavior demonstrated by Fudge, who frequently goes unpunished. Peter becomes annoyed with Fudge because he often disturbs his pet turtle, Dribble, which he won at his best friend Jimmy Fargo's birthday party. Furthermore, Fudge throws non-stop temper tantrums, goes through a finicky phase of abstaining from eating altogether, and emulates Peter's behavior, throwing tantrums if it is prohibited. Nevertheless, their parents, Warren and Anne, dote on Fudge, to Peter's anger and frustration.

For months, Fudge's antics continue; knocking his front teeth out after catapulting himself off the jungle gym at the playground at Central Park when he decides to fly, vandalizing Peter's school project, and taking off at a movie theater. One day, to Peter's absolute misery, he returns home to discover Dribble missing from his bowl, Fudge claiming to have swallowed him. These proclamations prove to be correct, and Fudge is rushed to the hospital, where Dribble is extracted, to Anne's relief. However, Dribble has died in Fudge's stomach, and no one, especially Fudge, seems to care. Peter is devastated over the loss of him; Warren and Anne sympathetically compensate by adopting a dog, and giving ownership of it to Peter, who appropriately names it Turtle in memory of Dribble.

Characters 

Peter Warren Hatcher – the protagonist of the story, and a smart, assertive, but seemingly naïve 9-year-old boy. Most of the book focuses upon his relationship with Fudge and his family, and the fact that Fudge is the perceived source of all of his troubles. His parents, Warren and Anne, usually seem to let Fudge get away with anything and everything, and though it does appear that Peter's needs and wants are often ignored and overshadowed in favor of Fudge's, this is not always the case. 

Peter believes that Warren and Anne show Fudge preferential treatment, especially Anne; he also is frequently frustrated when Fudge gets into his things and tries to become involved in his activities. However, Peter does love him very much and shows concern for him when he is hospitalized (after swallowing Peter's pet turtle, Dribble) and the doctors speculate that they may need to operate on him. Peter is very upset when he learns that Dribble is dead and is furious when he sees Fudge get showered with attention and gifts when he comes home, but then Warren comes home with a dog for Peter for being "a good sport" and to compensate for the loss.

Farley Drexel "Fudge" Hatcher – Peter's younger brother, whom he often resents. At the beginning of the book, Fudge (a nickname for his much-despised legal name, Farley) is 2½ years old, and turns 3 in Chapter 5. He is a very loud, demanding, and mischievous toddler who is prone to violent temper tantrums. He has a very active imagination, and others – including Sheila Tubman and the wife of one of his father's clients – adore him. In the final chapter, he swallows Peter's pet turtle, Dribble, and is hospitalized, but the doctors are able to help him expel him without surgery. Peter often sees him as a pest, but Fudge looks up to Peter, and eventually Peter realizes the bond that they have.

Anne Hatcher – Peter and Fudge's mother and Warren's wife. A caring mother, she shows love and devotion to her family and is very protective of Fudge. Her sometimes-overprotective ways with him sometimes cause problems for Peter; for example, when Fudge jumps off the jungle gym at the playground at Central Park (believing he is a bird that will land safely), she scolds Peter severely, holding him solely responsible for Fudge's injuries and not even listening to his side of the story. She later admits to becoming overly emotional with the aftermath of Fudge's flying experience and taking it out on Peter. When Fudge ruined Peter's school project, Anne spanked him, which surprised even Peter, who was convinced that everyone thought that Fudge could do no wrong, but Anne remarks that Fudge should have known better.

Warren Hatcher – Peter and Fudge's father and Ann's husband. He works at an unnamed advertising agency, whose major clients in Tales are Juicy-O, a fruit drink that the Hatchers find rather unpleasant, and Toddle Bike, a manufacturer of plastic toy tricycles à la the Big Wheel and Green Machine; Fudge is hired for a commercial for the latter product. Although most of Warren's clients are happy with his work and company, he also had his share of failures, such as losing the Juicy-O account. A loving father who wants what is best for his family, he is firmer and more conservative in rearing Peter and Fudge than Ann, particularly with Fudge. For example, when Fudge refused to eat unless he was fed like a dog, Warren was the one to finally lay down the law, that if Fudge didn't eat his food like a human, he would wear it. Unfortunately, Warren lacks in cooking and cleaning skills, and once cooked a disastrous dinner, and Fudge enforced his own "eat it or wear it" rule against him.

Dribble – Peter's pet turtle, which he won at Jimmy Fargo's birthday party. Dribble seems to always be annoyed by Fudge, which led to Fudge swallowing him. Afterwards, Warren gives Peter a dog to try to make up for the loss of him; he names it Turtle in memory of Dribble.

Sheila Tubman – Peter and Jimmy's classmate, who lives with her family in the same apartment building as the Hatchers. Peter is annoyed at the very thought of her, considering her to be a bossy know-it-all who still has cooties. She takes charge of a school project that she, Peter, and Jimmy were assigned to work on together, and though the experience was stressful at times for all, their efforts are rewarded with an "A". She is sometimes allowed to help babysit Fudge, proclaiming that she learned about babysitting from her older sister, Libby, who takes a babysitting class.

James "Jimmy" Fargo – Peter's best friend, at whose birthday party Peter won his pet turtle, Dribble. Peter and Jimmy have a special rock collection in the park and share a dislike for Sheila, which they must put aside when they are assigned to work on a school project together.

Chapters
Chapter 1: The Big Winner
 Peter wins his pet turtle, Dribble, at his friend Jimmy Fargo's birthday party, and shows him to everyone including Fudge, whom Peter warns not to touch him, and Fudge laughs like crazy.

Chapter 2: Mr. and Mrs. Juicy O
 Mr. and Mrs. Yarby stay with the Hatchers, and Fudge misbehaves, costing Warren an account, in the process.

Chapter 3: The Family Dog
 Fudge stops eating, and everyone tries to come up with ideas to get his appetite back. After some unorthodox methods, Warren finally lays down the law.

Chapter 4: My Brother the Bird
 When Peter, Jimmy, and Sheila go to the playground at Central Park to look after Fudge, he jumps off the jungle gym and knocks out his two front teeth. Ann initially blames Peter for the mishap, but later apologizes, claiming no one is to blame.

Chapter 5: The Birthday Bash
 Fudge has his third birthday party, with some equally troublesome friends, including a boy who eats himself sick, a girl who bites and wets her pants, and another boy who cries all the time.

Chapter 6: Fang Hits Town
 Fudge misbehaves when he, Peter, and Ann spend Saturday together. He refuses to buy a pair of shoes until Peter wears then, and wreaks havoc at a hamburger restaurant.

Chapter 7: The Flying Train Committee
 Peter, Jimmy, and Sheila work on a school project based on Transportation together. Fudge vandalizes their poster, prompting Ann to finally enforce some discipline.

Chapter 8: The T.V. Star
 Fudge is chosen to ride the Toddle Bike in a commercial, but proves to be high maintenance on set.

Chapter 9: Just Another Rainy Day
 Peter, Fudge, and Warren head to the movie theater, where Fudge goes missing. Warren later prepares a meal that proves inedible, which Fudge uses against him.

Chapter 10: Dribble!
 Fudge swallows Dribble, and is hospitalized. Fudge recovers, but Dribble is killed, much to Peter's dismay. In the end, Peter is given ownership of a puppy (which Warren promises will grow too big for Fudge to swallow), and names him Turtle in memory of Dribble.

References

External links
 Judy Blume's website

1972 American novels
American children's novels
E. P. Dutton books
Fudge series
Novels by Judy Blume
Novels set in New York City
1972 children's books